Cascades Water Aerodrome  is located  north of Cascades on the Gatineau River, Quebec, Canada. It is open from mid-April to mid-December.

References

Registered aerodromes in Outaouais
Seaplane bases in Quebec